Vitaliy Khudyakov (born August 7, 1994) is a Kazakhstani marathon swimmer. Current Capri-Napoli Marathon record holder which he set in 2014. He competed in the men's marathon 10 kilometre event at the 2016 Summer Olympics but was disqualified.

References

1994 births
Living people
Kazakhstani male long-distance swimmers
Olympic swimmers of Kazakhstan
Swimmers at the 2016 Summer Olympics
21st-century Kazakhstani people